The 10th Annual NFL Honors was an awards presentation by the National Football League that honored its players from the 2020 NFL season. Due to the COVID-19 pandemic, it was a multi-site ceremony, with two sites being used in the host city of Tampa, Florida; the Straz Center for the Performing Arts and host stadium Raymond James Stadium, and SoFi Stadium in Inglewood, California.

For the third consecutive year, Steve Harvey hosted the show. Harvey joined Alec Baldwin as the only two people to host the show three times. The show featured performances by Green Day during the opening segment and Leslie Odom Jr. during the in-memoriam segment.

This is the first NFL honors to air live as opposed to prerecorded same day broadcast as in previous years.

List of award winners

Winners and candidates

Winners are denoted in bold

AP Most Valuable Player

AP Coach of the Year

AP Offensive Player of the Year

AP Defensive Player of the Year

Pepsi Next Rookie of the Year

FedEx Air Player of the Year

FedEx Ground Player of the Year

Walter Payton NFL Man of the Year Award

References

NFL Honors 010
2020 National Football League season
2021 in American football